Dalophia gigantea is an amphisbaenian species in the family Amphisbaenidae. The species is endemic to the Democratic Republic of the Congo.

References

Dalophia
Reptiles described in 1903
Taxa named by Mario Giacinto Peracca
Endemic fauna of the Democratic Republic of the Congo
Reptiles of the Democratic Republic of the Congo